Rostam Khan Judaki (also Romanized as Rostam Khān Jūdakī; also known as Rostam Khān and Rustam Khān) is a village in Veysian Rural District, Veysian District, Dowreh County, Lorestan Province, Iran. At the 2006 census, its population was 24, in 6 families.

References 

Towns and villages in Dowreh County